The City of Lancaster is a local government district of Lancashire, England, with the status of a city and non-metropolitan district. It is named after its largest settlement, Lancaster, but covers a far larger area, which includes the towns of Morecambe, Heysham, and Carnforth, as well as outlying villages, farms, rural hinterland and (since 1 August 2016) a section of the Yorkshire Dales National Park.

History
The current city boundaries were set as part of the provisions of the Local Government Act 1972, which created a non-metropolitan district on 1 April 1974 covering the territory of five former districts, which were abolished at the same time:
Carnforth Urban District
Lancaster Municipal Borough
Lancaster Rural District
Lunesdale Rural District
Morecambe and Heysham Municipal Borough
The city status which had been held by the old municipal borough of Lancaster since 1937 was transferred to the non-metropolitan district on 1 April 1974, the day the new district came into being.

Council

The higher tier of local government is Lancashire County Council.  At a lower level, there are many parish councils: See this list of civil parishes in the district.

The district comprises two parliamentary constituencies: Lancaster and Fleetwood, and Morecambe and Lunesdale.  Since 2015, Lancaster and Fleetwood has been held by Labour, and Morecambe and Lunesdale has been held by the Conservatives since 2010.

, the composition of the City Council is as follows (with 2 seats vacant):

The leader of the council since May 2021 has been Caroline Jackson of the Green Party, leading a coalition administration. Elections for all council seats are held every four years. The last election was in 2019 and the next election is scheduled for 2023.

Premises

The council has two main meeting places, both inherited from predecessor authorities: Lancaster Town Hall and Morecambe Town Hall. Full council meetings are held in the larger council chamber of Morecambe Town Hall, but Lancaster Town Hall is also used for committee meetings and houses administrative functions.

Demography

At the 2011 UK census, the City of Lancaster had a total population of 138,375. Of the 57,822 households in the city, 33.5% were married couples living together, 31.9% were one-person households, 7.8% were co-habiting couples and 10.0% were lone parents. These figures were similar to the national averages.

Of those aged 16–74 in Lancaster, 26.7% had no academic qualifications, lower than 28.9% in all of England. The city of Lancaster had a higher proportion of white people than England.

Population change
The table below details the population change since 1801, including the percentage change since the last available census data. Although the City of Lancaster has existed as a district since 1974, figures have been generated by combining data from the towns, villages, and civil parishes that would later be constituent parts of the city.

Religion

At the 2011 UK census, 65.9% of Lancaster's population reported themselves as Christian, 1.3% Muslim, 0.4% Buddhist, 0.3% Hindu, 0.1% Jewish, and 0.1% Sikh. 24.5% had no religion, 0.5% had an alternative religion and 7.1% did not state their religion. The city is covered by the Roman Catholic Diocese of Lancaster, and the Church of England Diocese of Blackburn.

Economy

At the United Kingdom Census 2001, the City of Lancaster had 97,365 residents aged 16 to 74. Of these people, 4.0% were students with jobs, 9.6% students without jobs, 5.1% looking after home or family, 6.0% permanently sick or disabled and 2.8% economically inactive for other reasons.

In 2001, of the 55,906 residents of the City of Lancaster in employment, the industry of employment was 16.7% retail and wholesale, 14.2% health and social work, 11.4% education, 11.2% manufacturing, 7.8% property and business services, 6.7% construction, 6.7% hotels and restaurants, 6.5% transport and communications, 5.7% public administration and defence, 2.5% finance, 2.4% energy and water supply, 2.2% agriculture, 0.4% mining, and 5.3% other. This was roughly in line with national figures, although the proportion of jobs in agriculture which was more than the national average of 1.5% and the percentage of people working in finance was below the national average of 4.8%; the proportion of people working in property was well below the national average of 13.2%.

Settlements

Civil parishes

Aldcliffe-with-Stodday
Arkholme-with-Cawood
Bolton-le-Sands
Borwick
Burrow-with-Burrow
Cantsfield
Carnforth
Caton-with-Littledale
Claughton
Cockerham
Ellel
Gressingham
Halton-with-Aughton
Heaton-with-Oxcliffe
Hornby-with-Farleton
Ireby
Leck
Melling-with-Wrayton
Middleton
Morecambe
Nether Kellet
Over Kellet
Over Wyresdale
Overton
Priest Hutton
Quernmore
Roeburndale
Scotforth
Silverdale
Slyne-with-Hest
Tatham
Thurnham
Tunstall
Warton
Wennington
Whittington
Wray-with-Botton
Yealand Conyers
Yealand Redmayne

Lancaster and Heysham lie within unparished areas.

Twin towns

 Perpignan, France (since 1962)
 Rendsburg, Germany (since 1968)
 Aalborg, Denmark (since 1982)
 Lublin, Poland (since 1994)
 Växjö, Sweden (since 1996)

Associate towns

 Almere, Netherlands
 Viana do Castelo, Portugal

References

External links

Lancaster City Council website

 
Cities in North West England
Non-metropolitan districts of Lancashire
Boroughs in England